Jan Niemiec (1941 – 14 September 2017) was a Polish slalom canoeist who competed in the 1960s. He won a bronze medal in the folding K-1 team event at the 1961 ICF Canoe Slalom World Championships in Hainsberg.

He died on September 14, 2017, in Wołomin, Poland in the age of 76.

References

Polish male canoeists
1941 births
2017 deaths
Place of birth missing
Medalists at the ICF Canoe Slalom World Championships